In Liechtenstein, the standard time is Central European Time (CET; UTC+01:00). Daylight saving time is observed from the last Sunday in March (02:00 CET) to the last Sunday in October (03:00 CEST). Liechtenstein adopted CET in 1894.

History 
Liechtenstein adopted CET in 1894. Liechtenstein first observed daylight saving time in 1941 and 1942, in-line with Switzerland, and again since 1981.

IANA time zone database 
The IANA time zone database in the file zone.tab contains one zone for Liechtenstein: Europe/Vaduz. Data below is for Liechtenstein directly from zone.tab of the IANA time zone database. Columns marked with * are the columns from zone.tab itself:

See also 
Time in Europe
Time in Switzerland

References

External links 
Current time in Liechtenstein at Time.is